Sir W. G. Armstrong Whitworth Aircraft Company, or Armstrong Whitworth Aircraft, was a British aircraft manufacturer.

History
Armstrong Whitworth Aircraft was established as the Aerial Department of the Sir W. G. Armstrong Whitworth & Company engineering group in Newcastle-upon-Tyne in 1912, and from c. 1914 to 1917 employed the Dutch aircraft designer Frederick Koolhoven (hence the "F.K." models).

In 1920, Armstrong Whitworth acquired the engine and automobile manufacturer Siddeley-Deasy. The engine and automotive businesses of both companies were spun off as Armstrong Siddeley and the aircraft interests as the Sir W. G. Armstrong Whitworth Aircraft Company. When Vickers and Armstrong Whitworth merged in 1927 to form Vickers-Armstrongs, Armstrong Whitworth Aircraft and Armstrong Siddeley were bought out by J. D. Siddeley and did not join the new grouping. This left two aircraft companies with Armstrong in the name – Vickers-Armstrongs (usually known as just "Vickers") and "Armstrong-Whitworth".

The most successful aircraft made by Armstrong-Whitworth in the inter-war period was the Siskin which first flew in 1919 and remained in RAF service until 1932, with 485 produced.

In 1935, J. D. Siddeley retired and Armstrong Whitworth Aircraft was purchased by Hawker Aircraft, the new group becoming Hawker Siddeley Aircraft. The component companies of Hawker Siddeley co-operated, but operated as individual entities.

In March 1936, the first Armstrong Whitworth Whitley bomber aircraft made its maiden flight and a total of 1,814 were produced for the RAF, ending in July 1943. During the war, Armstrong Whitworth also produced 1,328 Avro Lancasters and designed the Armstrong Whitworth Albemarle reconnaissance bomber which was then made by A. W. Hawksley Ltd, part of the Hawker Siddeley group.

Armstrong Whitworth built 281 Avro Lincolns at Baginton from 1945 to 1951. Then, during the 1950s Armstrong Whitworth Aircraft built many Gloster Meteor, Hawker Seahawk, Hawker Hunter and Gloster Javelin jet fighters at their Bitteswell and Baginton factories for delivery to the Royal Air Force, the Royal Navy and the Royal Belgian Air Force.

The Armstrong Whitworth Apollo airliner was unsuccessful and the company was eventually merged with another Hawker Siddeley company, Gloster Aircraft Company, to form Whitworth Gloster Aircraft in 1961. In 1963 Hawker Siddeley dropped the names of the component companies from its products, the last Armstrong Whitworth product, the Argosy, becoming the Hawker Siddeley Argosy.

Products

Aircraft
Date of first flight in parenthesis.

Armstrong Whitworth Aerial Department
Armstrong Whitworth F.K.1 (1914) – "Sissit"
Armstrong Whitworth F.K.3 (1915)
Armstrong Whitworth F.K.4 (1915) – gondola for SS class airship
Armstrong Whitworth F.K.6 (1916) – Escort fighter triplane
Armstrong Whitworth F.K.8 (1916) –  "Big Ack" (1,200 built)
Armstrong Whitworth F.K.9 (1916)
Armstrong Whitworth F.K.10 (1917) – "Quadriplane" (8 built)
Armstrong Whitworth Armadillo (1918) (One built)
Armstrong Whitworth Ara (1919)
Armstrong Whitworth Tadpole
Armstrong Whitworth Siskin (1919) (485 built)
Armstrong-Siddeley Aircraft
Armstrong-Siddeley Siniai (1921) – Bomber (1 built)
Armstrong-Whitworth Aircraft
Armstrong Whitworth Awana (1923)
Armstrong Whitworth Wolf (1923)
Armstrong Whitworth Atlas (1925)
Armstrong Whitworth Ajax (1925)
Armstrong Whitworth A.W.14 Starling
Armstrong Whitworth Ape (1926)
Armstrong Whitworth Argosy (1926)
Armstrong Whitworth A.W.15 Atalanta (1932)
Armstrong Whitworth A.W.16 (1930)
Armstrong Whitworth A.W.17 Aries (1930)
Armstrong Whitworth A.W.18 – heavy bomber project
Armstrong Whitworth A.W.19 (1934)
Armstrong Whitworth A.W.20 – monoplane day bomber project
Armstrong Whitworth A.W.21 – monoplane fighter project
Armstrong Whitworth A.W.22 – monoplane project
Armstrong Whitworth A.W.23 (1935)
Armstrong Whitworth A.W.24 – monoplane day bomber project
Armstrong Whitworth A.W.27 Ensign (1938)
Armstrong Whitworth A.W.28 – single-seat biplane fighter project
Armstrong Whitworth A.W.29 (1936) – competing design for Specification P.27/32 for a day bomber
Armstrong Whitworth A.W.30 – twin-engined monoplane bomber project
Armstrong Whitworth A.W.31 – single-seat biplane fighter project
Armstrong Whitworth A.W.32 – braced two-seat monoplane project
Armstrong Whitworth A.W.33 – twin-engined two-seat monoplane turret fighter project
Armstrong Whitworth A.W.34 – twin-engined fighter project
Armstrong Whitworth A.W.35 Scimitar (1935)
Armstrong Whitworth A.W.36 – two-seat Army co-op biplane project
Armstrong Whitworth A.W.37 – two-seat general purpose biplane project
Armstrong Whitworth A.W.38 Whitley (1936)
Armstrong Whitworth A.W.39 – heavy bomber project
Armstrong Whitworth A.W.40 – monoplane mail carrier project
Armstrong Whitworth A.W.41 Albemarle (1940)
Armstrong Whitworth A.W.43 – monoplane airliner project
Armstrong Whitworth A.W.44 – four-engine bomber project
Armstrong Whitworth A.W.45 – monoplane medium bomber (and/or recce?) project
Armstrong Whitworth A.W.48 – medium (heavy?) bomber project
Armstrong Whitworth A.W.49 – twin-boom, laminar wing bomber (low level attack) project 
Armstrong Whitworth A.W.50 – tailless monoplane project
Armstrong Whitworth A.W.51 – two-seat tailless glider project
Armstrong Whitworth A.W.52 (1947) – flying wing, prototypes only
Armstrong Whitworth A.W.53 – twin-engined fast torpedo scout (bomber?) project
Armstrong Whitworth A.W.54 – naval reconnaissance aircraft project
Armstrong Whitworth A.W.55 Apollo (1949)
Armstrong Whitworth A.W.56 – flying wing medium bomber project
Armstrong Whitworth A.W.57 – medium-range 4-engine passenger transport project
Armstrong Whitworth A.W.58 – advanced 59° swept wing Mach 1.2 research aircraft project
Armstrong Whitworth A.W.59 – variable wing-sweep research aircraft proposal
Armstrong Whitworth Argosy (AW.650 / 660) (1959)
Armstrong Whitworth AW.681 – proposed STOL military transport aircraft design
Armstrong Whitworth A.W.690 – proposed VTOL version of Nord Noratlas transport
Armstrong Whitworth A.W.168 – proposed tactical bomber design
Armstrong Whitworth AW.169 – proposed design for Operational Requirement F.155 high altitude supersonic interceptor
Armstrong Whitworth AW.171 – supersonic VTOL flying wing
Hawker Sea Hawk – produced as part of Hawker Siddeley Aircraft
Armstrong Whitworth Meteor NF.11 – redesign of the Gloster Meteor produced as part of Hawker Siddeley Aircraft

Airships
 R25r airship
 R29 – airship
 R33 – airship

Missiles
 Seaslug (missile)

See also
 Aerospace industry in the United Kingdom

References

Notes

Bibliography

 Tapper, Oliver. Armstrong Whitworth Aircraft since 1913. London:Putnam, 1988. .

External links

The History of Sir W. G. Armstrong Whitworth Aircraft Limited 

Armstrong Whitworth
Companies based in Warwickshire
Defunct aircraft manufacturers of the United Kingdom
Guided missile manufacturers
Hawker Siddeley
History of Warwickshire
Manufacturing companies established in 1912
Science and technology in Warwickshire
1912 establishments in England
Manufacturing companies disestablished in 1961
1961 establishments in England